Moonie is a rural town in the Western Downs Region and a locality split between the Western Downs Region and the Goondiwindi Region in Queensland, Australia.

Geography 
The locality is split between the Western Downs Region (northern part of the locality) and the Goondiwindi Region (southern part of the locality).

The Moonie Highway passes through the locality from the north-east to the south-west. The Leichhardt Highway passes through the locality from the north to the south. The town is at the intersection of the two highways.

History
The town's name is derived from Moonie River, which was first recorded as Mooni by Sir Thomas Mitchell in November 1846 when he passed through the region.

Moonie State School opened on 14 May 1962.

In 1973, a church building was moved from Drillham to Moonie to become Our Lady of the Way Catholic Church.

Moonie Post Office opened by June 1966 closed in 1983.

Moonie Library opened in 2003.

Economy 

In December 1961, Moonie was the site of Australia's first commercial oil field, a very small field consisting of less than one percent of Australia's oil and gas reserves.  The oil field is still operational.  The region is also an agricultural area that produces grain, beef cattle and prime lambs.

Education 
Moonie State School is a government primary (Early Childhood-6) school for boys and girls at 11305 Moonie Highway. In 2016, the school had an enrolment of 43 students with 4 teachers (3 full-time equivalent) and 5 non-teaching staff (2 full-time equivalent). In 2018, the school had an enrolment of 27 students with 2 teachers and 6 non-teaching staff (3 full-time equivalent).

There is no secondary school in Moonie. The nearest government secondary school is Tara Shire State School in neighbouring Tara to the north. However, unless resident in the northern parts of the locality of Moonie, the distances involved are so large that distance education and boarding school would be other options.

Amenities 
The town has  a service station, the Moonie Sports Club, a pool and a motel.

Moonie Library is on the eastern corner of the Leichhardt Highway and the Moonie Highway.

Our Lady of the Way Catholic Church is on the Moonie Highway. It is part of the parish of St Mary of the Angels' Parish based in Tara within the Roman Catholic Diocese of Toowoomba.

References

External links
 

Towns in Queensland
Towns in the Darling Downs
Western Downs Region
Goondiwindi Region
Localities in Queensland